A pea coat (or peacoat, pea jacket, pilot jacket, reefer jacket) is an outer coat, generally of a navy-coloured heavy wool, originally worn by sailors of European and later American navies. Pea coats are characterized by short length, broad lapels, double-breasted fronts, often large wooden, metal or plastic buttons, three or four in two rows, and vertical or slash pockets. References to the pea jacket appear in American newspapers at least as early as the 1720s, and modern renditions still maintain the original design and composition.

A "bridge coat" is a pea coat that extends to the thighs, and is a uniform exclusively for officers and chief petty officers. The reefer jacket is for officers and chief petty officers only, and is identical to the basic design, but usually has gold buttons and epaulettes. Only officers wear the epaulettes.

Etymology
According to a 1975 edition of The Mariner's Mirror, the term "pea coat" originated from the Dutch or West Frisian word pijjekker or pijjakker, in which pij referred to the type of cloth used, a coarse kind of twilled blue cloth with a nap on one side. Jakker designates a man’s short, heavy coat.

Another theory, favoured by the US Navy, is that the heavy topcoat worn in cold, miserable weather by seafaring men was once tailored from "pilot cloth"  a heavy, coarse, stout kind of twilled blue cloth with the nap on one side. This was sometimes called P-cloth from the initial letter of pilot, and the garment made from it was called a P-jacket  later a pea coat. The term has been used since 1723 to denote coats made from that cloth.

Characteristics 
Today, the style is considered a classic, and pea coats are worn by all manner of individuals. The style has evolved to the addition of hoods.

While some of the jackets seen on the street are genuine navy surplus, most are designs inspired by the classic uniform and available from retailers with design variations that reflect current fashion trends, including a variety of fabrics and colours. The standard US Navy-issued pea coat uses dark blue or black wool and sports buttons (originally in brass and later black plastic) decorated with an anchor motif. The standard fabric for historical pea coats in the 20th century was a smooth and heavy, dark navy blue Kersey wool, which was dense enough to repel wind and rain, and able to contain body heat without further insulation. This wool was left lightly treated after being sheared to retain much of the natural lanolin oil from sheep, thus increasing its water-repelling and insulating properties.  Kersey was gradually replaced in the U.S. Navy through the 1970s by the rougher black Melton cloth (also lightly treated), a lighter wool that requires a quilted lining to match the warmth of the original Kersey.

A black leather version of the reefer jacket was worn by Kriegsmarine U-boat officers during World War II, including Admiral Dönitz. It was also worn with a peaked cap by Red Army commissars, tank commanders, and pilots.

Popular Cultures
 Doctor Who features leather peacoats being worn by the Doctor during his eighth and ninth incarnations.

See also
Chesterfield coat
Covert coat
Duffle coat
Greatcoat
Paletot
Polo coat
Trench coat

References

External links 
 

2010s fashion
Coats (clothing)
Jackets
Military uniforms